King Edward's Witley is a private co-educational boarding and day school, founded in 1553 by King Edward VI and Nicholas Ridley, Bishop of London and Westminster. The School is located in the village of Wormley (near Witley), Surrey, England, having moved to its present location in 1867. The School became fully co-educational in 1952. As of September 2010, the school has joined the small number of independent schools in the UK which offer the IB Diploma Programme in place of A-Levels in the sixth form. The school re-introduced A-levels as part of the curriculum from September 2015.

History

The school was founded as Bridewell Royal Hospital, after Nicholas Ridley petitioned Edward VI to give some of his empty palaces over to the City of London (governed by the City of London Corporation) to house homeless women and children.

In 1867 the school moved from the City of London to its present location in Surrey, at the same time adopting the current name. In common with other large building located outside of urban areas the school installed its own gasworks.

The School was commandeered by the Royal Navy during the Second World War to test and develop the use of radar. The School still remembers this with a plaque in the central area, a junction of corridors known as 'Piccadilly'. The president of Bridewell Royal Hospital (the title was kept after the move of location) is now Birgitte, Duchess of Gloucester, appointed from 1 January 2006. Queen Elizabeth The Queen Mother held the title from 1953 to 2002. The school's creation was sanctioned by the same charter as that of Christ's Hospital and St Thomas' Hospital, and uses the same coat of arms as Christ's Hospital. The School maintains strong links with the City of London, and is still supported by it, with some pupils on bursaries funded by the city. As of the academic year 2021/22 Senior School day fees are £20,520 per year, with senior school boarding fees £33,675 per year, though a number of bursaries and scholarships are available.

The school has had one known instance of impropriety. In early 2015 Edward Moore, a choirmaster, was convicted to a 9-month sentence for inappropriate conduct with a girl student.

In July 2019 the Department for Education requested an unannounced additional visit by the Independent Schools Inspectorate to check the School's compliance with legal regulations and standards. The School was judged not to be meeting regulations including those relating to safeguarding.

In February 2020 the school underwent an unannounced progress monitoring visit in order to check if the School had fully implemented the plans set out following the visit in July 2019. The findings of the inspection were that the school met the required standards for the regulations that were the main focus of the visit. The School met all of the requirements of the Education (Independent School Standards) Regulation 2014, National Minimum Standards for Boarding Schools 2015, and no further action was required as a result of the visit.

Houses
There are six senior Houses in total, four male and two female. The Houses at the School are paired, and, in the case of the senior pupils, conjoined in the centre of the buildings. This central area allows the boys and girls from the paired Houses to meet in the evenings and during spare time. The Lower School pupils board in Queen Mary House (QMH) where there are shared communal areas and separate sleeping quarters.

The senior Houses were built in the 1970s, and the plans can be seen in the school museum, housed in the History Department. Boarders moved into these new buildings in fall 1976 and the inauguration was commemorated by a visit from Queen Elizabeth The Queen Mother.

The school recently renovated some of the Senior Houses. Ridley relocated next to Grafton.

Ridley's relocation leaves 'Old Ridley' and St Bridget's, a former girls House, empty and work has already begun on re-purposing these houses into a day-and-boarding, mixed house reserved for Upper Sixth pupils due to open in September 2022.

The houses, in their pairs, are:

Juniors
Queen Mary House - Queen Mary was president of the School from 1940 until 1953. It is known as QMH.

Seniors

Wakefield – After Charles Wakefield, 1st Viscount Wakefield, president and benefactor from 1916 to 1940. This is a boys' House. Paired with Elizabeth.
Elizabeth – After Queen Elizabeth The Queen Mother, president of Bridewell Royal Hospital from 1953 to 2002. She visited the School four times, in 1958, 1965, 1976 and 1991. This is a girls' House and is paired with Wakefield
Edward – After King Edward VI, the founder. This is a boys' House and is paired with Tudor.
Tudor – After The House of Tudor, the current royal family at the time of the School's founding. This is a girls' House and paired with Edward.
Grafton – After Richard Grafton, MP, printer and historian. The first treasurer of Bridewell Royal Hospital. This is a boys' House and was formerly paired with St Bridget's but is now a bachelor House.
Queens' - After the two queens who have been presidents (Mary and Elizabeth). This girls' House closed as of September 2019.
 Ridley – Named after bishop Nicholas Ridley, who preached to King Edward to request Bridewell Palace be given to the City of London for charitable purposes. This House was unused for a number of years, but re-opened September 2013 having undergone extensive refurbishment. This is a boys' day House.
St Bridget's – Saint Brigid of Kildare was a 5th-century Irish saint who is associated with a well which gave its name to the church of St. Bride and then to the palace, Bridewell Palace, built by Henry VIII. St Bridget's and 'Old Ridley' are being renovated to create an Upper Sixth Form House due to open in September 2022.

School publications
There school alumni magazine, KEStrel, published bi-annually, that incorporates recent school events and news.

Notable Old Witleians

Former pupils of King Edward's are referred to as Old Witleians, or Old Wits.
Phil Andrew - Archdeacon of Cheltenham
Sally Bercow - wife of John Bercow, former Speaker of the House of Commons
Ivor Caplin - Labour Member of Parliament
Edd China - television presenter
Sir Peter Estlin - Lord Mayor of London
Liz Gordon - New Zealand Member of Parliament
Du'aine Ladejo - Olympic silver medalist
Jemma Mitchell case - Murderer
James Mullinger - comedian
Sung-Hak Mun - racing driver
Richard Short - actor
Edward Tudor-Pole - musician and actor

Heads

 Joseph Myall ( –1856)
 Edward Rudge (1856–1886)
 Gerard Mason (1886–1900)
 Charles Raynham (1900–1926)
 Alfred Bellerby (1926–1951)
 Gordon Humphreys
 John Hansford (1969–1980)
 Richard Wilkinson
 Rodney Fox (1988–2000)
 Kerr Fulton-Peebles (2000–2010)
 John Attwater (2010–2019)
 Joanna Wright (2019– )

Notable associations

Christopher Cocksworth - teacher (1981–1984)
Caroline Cox, Baroness Cox – governor
Birgitte, Duchess of Gloucester - patron
John Palmer, 4th Earl of Selborne – treasurer (1972–1983)
Samuel Pepys – governor in the 17th century
Sir James Sanderson, 1st Baronet – president of Bridewell (1793–98)
Sir John Stuttard - governor

References

Further reading
King Edward’s School: Bridewell to Witley 1553-2005, Bertie Mawer, 2000. 
Bethlem Hospital 1247-1997, Patricia Aldridge
The City of London, Mary Cathcart Borer, 1977
Bridewell Royal Hospital and King Edward’s Schools, Alfred J. Copeland, 1912
The Last Tudor King, Hesther W. Chapman, 1958
Chronicle, Richard Grafton
Old Bridewell (Monograph), R.S. Mylne, 1905
Bridewell Hospital Palace, Prison, Schools, E.C. O’Donoghue, 1929
Henry VIII, A.W. Pollard, 1905
Nicholas Ridley, Jasper Ridley, 1957
Works of Nicholas Ridley, Parker Society Cambridge, 1953

External links

King Edward's Witley website
Profile on the Independent Schools Council website

1553 establishments in England
Member schools of the Headmasters' and Headmistresses' Conference
Educational institutions established in the 1550s
Boarding schools in Surrey
Private schools in Surrey
International Baccalaureate schools in England
Godalming
 
Church of England private schools in the Diocese of Guildford
Schools with a royal charter
King Edward VI Schools